The Sandy and Beaver Canal was a canal and lock transportation system which ran seventy-three miles from the Ohio and Erie Canal at Bolivar, Ohio, to the Ohio River at Glasgow, Pennsylvania.

It was chartered in 1828 and completed twenty years later. It ceased operations in 1852.

History and features
In 1828, Major D.B. Douglas of the United States Military Academy surveyed potential new canal routes, including the site that would ultimately be chosen as the location for the Sandy and Beaver Canal. The canal was then chartered later that year.

Completed in 1848, it had ninety locks. From the time of its opening, however, its middle section had repeated problems and ultimately fell into disrepair. 

The canal ceased to operate in 1852, when the Cold Run Reservoir Dam outside of Lisbon, Ohio failed, ruining a large section of the canal.

The Douglas plan was rejected, and the Philadelphia Board of Trade decided that the Pennsylvania and Ohio Canal would be a better option to join the canal systems of Ohio to those of Pennsylvania.

At a meeting in Waynesburg, Ohio, in 1834, the canal promoters decided to go ahead without the Philadelphia backing. Hother Hage and Edward H. Gill were hired to engineer the project, and made changes to the Douglas plan. The big tunnel was 900 yards or 1060 yards long.

Construction progressed until being interrupted by financial difficulties of the Panic of 1837. The number of workmen decreased from 2000 to 200. Little was done for seven years, and the tunnels were finally completed in 1848. Aside from the reservoir collapse in 1852, the Cleveland and Pittsburgh Railroad was built that year, taking business away.  Six miles on the west end of the canal were used as a feeder of the Ohio and Erie Canal until 1884, when the aqueduct was lost in a flood.

A company called the “Nimishillen and Sandy Slackwater Navigation” was established to investigate a connector along the Nimishillen Creek from Sandyville, Ohio to Canton, Ohio in 1834–35.  It was determined there was not enough water flow along this route to build a canal. A similar stillborn plan called the “Still Fork of Sandy Navigation Company” was incorporated in 1837 by some Carroll County, Ohio men to build a connector from Pekin up the Still Fork to near Carrollton, Ohio.

An original dam near Waynesburg, still impounds a slackwater on the Sandy Creek, and feeds a section of canal downstream to Magnolia, Ohio.

Only  of this privately funded canal lay in Pennsylvania; the rest was in Ohio.

See also
Hanoverton Canal Town District
List of canals in the United States
Elson Mill is fed by the canal.

References

External links
Pennsylvania Canal Society
American Canal Society
National Canal Museum
Lock 19 Historical Marker

Canals in Ohio
Canals in Pennsylvania
Transportation in Carroll County, Ohio
Transportation in Tuscarawas County, Ohio
Transportation in Columbiana County, Ohio
Transportation in Stark County, Ohio
Transportation buildings and structures in Beaver County, Pennsylvania
Canals opened in 1848